The Los Angeles Times 500 was an annual NASCAR Winston Cup race held at Ontario Motor Speedway in Ontario, California, United States, in February from 1971 to 1972 and in November from 1974 to 1980.

Past winners

Multiple winners (drivers)

Multiple winners (teams)

Manufacturer wins

Notes
 Ontario's first two NASCAR 500s were run in late February and early March and both were won by A. J. Foyt in the Wood Brothers Mercury. Foyt's 1972 win was his final NASCAR-sanctioned win. The purse for these races were $180,200 and $175,345 respectively, surpassing the Daytona 500's as the highest in the series.
 Ownership changes at Ontario Motor Speedway kept the scheduled March 4, 1973 NASCAR event from running.
 Bobby Allison won the 1974 running for Roger Penske's first win on a NASCAR oval; Allison was fined nearly $10,000 after the race when postrace inspection discovered unapproved valve lifters.
 David Pearson led the final 120 laps in a runaway win in 1976; it was his tenth big-track win of the season.
 Bonnett's 1977 win was his first on a superspeedway and the last for the Dodge marque until 2001.  Dodges finished 1-2 as Richard Petty skidded through Turn Four in a last-lap bid for the win.
 Janet Guthrie in 1977 would lead five laps under caution it was the first time a woman led a lap in Cup Series, and it would not happen again until 2013 when a woman would lead laps in a race in Cup Series.
 Bobby Allison posted his fifth win of 1978 in the Times 500.  Richard Petty engaged Allison and others in a huge battle for the lead in the first half of the race, driving a Chevrolet, before blowing his engine.  Cale Yarborough pitted on the pace lap with distributor problems but rallied to finish third.
 The 1979 500 was the race that clinched the seventh driving title for Richard Petty, while the 1980 500 clinched the first driving title for Dale Earnhardt.  Benny Parsons won both times. The 1980 race also was contested on a Saturday.
 The 500 was a combination race between Winston Cup and NASCAR's Winston West series.  The Winston West series staged two stand-alone races at Ontario — on May 15, 1977, Gary Johnson edged Bill Schmitt in the Winston 250, while on April 13, 1980, Canadian racer Roy Smith passed Schmitt with eleven laps to go to win the Datsun 200.
 Ontario also hosted double-header races, the Datsun Twin 200, for Indy cars and stock cars under United States Auto Club sanction, which also drew numerous NASCAR competitors.  On March 6, 1977 Jimmy Insolo edged Bobby Unser and A. J. Foyt in the stock car 200; on March 26, 1978, Foyt led 71 of 80 laps to beat Jim Thirkettle and Insolo; on March 25, 1979, Foyt beat Joe Ruttman and Rusty Wallace for the 200-mile win.

References

External links
 

1971 establishments in California
1980 disestablishments in California
Former NASCAR races
Los Angeles Times
 
Recurring sporting events disestablished in 1980
Recurring sporting events established in 1971